Wilkie Airport  is an abandoned aerodrome that was located adjacent to Wilkie, Saskatchewan, Canada.

See also 
 List of airports in Saskatchewan
 List of defunct airports in Canada

References 

Defunct airports in Saskatchewan
Reford No. 379, Saskatchewan